Lucius (foaled 1969) was a British-bred Thoroughbred racehorse who competed in National Hunt racing. He is best known for winning the 1978 Grand National.

Background
Lucius was sired by Perhapsburg out of Matches. In 1972 he was bought by Fiona Whitaker, who had him trained by Gordon W. Richards.

Racing career
Lucius entered the 1978 Grand National as a 14/1 chance. His regular jockey David Goulding suffered an injury prior to the race so Bob Davies was brought in as a last minute replacement.

Davies had never ridden Lucius before so raced cautiously and managed to win a very close race. This proved to be Lucius's last ever race. He was retired the next season and died in his sleep at the age of twenty seven.

Grand National record

References

1969 racehorse births
Racehorses bred in the United Kingdom
Racehorses trained in the United Kingdom
Grand National winners